Saint Just was an Italian progressive rock band from Naples. They were named after French revolutionary  Louis Antoine de Saint-Just.
The band released two albums between 1973-1974. In 2011 vocalist Jane "Jenny" Sorrenti and guitarist Toni Verde reformed the band with different musicians.

Band members
Jane "Jenny" Sorrenti - vocals
Toni Verde - guitar, bass, vocals
Robert Fix - sax
Tito Rinesi - guitar, vocals
Andrea Faccenda - guitar, keyboards
Fulvio Maras - drums, percussion

Discography
Albums
Saint Just (1973)
La Casa del Lago (1974)
Prog Explosion (2011)

References 

Italian progressive rock groups